Yang Ching-shun (Chinese: 楊清順; born 3 April 1978) is a Taiwanese professional pool player, nicknamed "the Son of Pool".

Yang won the nine-ball event of the 1998 Asian Games against then World Pool champion Kunihiko Takahashi. He defended it in 2002 against Warren Kiamco. In an unsuccessful attempt to defend that title for the second time, Yang settled for 3rd place as he was bested in the semi-finals by Jeff de Luna who then finished second to Antonio Gabica.

Despite the fact that he never won a world championship in any discipline of pool like his fellow Taiwanese player Chao Fong-pang did, Yang has often been regarded as a potential world champion.

His best finish in the World Pool Championship is 3rd where he reached the semi-finals in 2002. However, he was bested by Francisco Bustamante who eventually lost to Earl Strickland in the finals

When his father died while he was still a child, Yang was left to fend for his own along with his mother. He express no interest in his studies and chose to work in a local billiard hall near his home, where he met Chao Fong Pang. He first started playing pool at the age of 14 and by the time he was 16, he was Japan open champion beating Fransico Bustamante. His hobbies include golf and fishing.

Titles
 2008 Guinness Asian 9-Ball Tour (Jakarta Leg)
 2007 Guinness Asian 9-Ball Tour (Singapore Leg)
 2007 Guinness Asian 9-Ball Tour (China Leg)
 2007 Guinness Asian 9-Ball Tour (Kaohshiung Leg)
 2007 Money Game King Showdown
 2006 Mezz Crowd Nine-ball Doubles Cup 
 2005 Guinness Asian 9-Ball Tour (Kaohsiung Leg)
 2004 Guinness Asian 9-Ball Tour (Hong Kong Leg)
 2003 Guinness Asian 9-Ball Tour (Singapore Leg)
 2002 Asian Games Nine-ball Singles
 2001 World Games Nine-ball Singles 
 2002 Asian Games Nine-ball Singles
 1996 All Japan Championship 9-Ball

References

Living people
1978 births
Taiwanese pool players
Place of birth missing (living people)
Sportspeople from Kaohsiung
Asian Games medalists in cue sports
Cue sports players at the 1998 Asian Games
Cue sports players at the 2002 Asian Games
Cue sports players at the 2006 Asian Games
Asian Games gold medalists for Chinese Taipei
Asian Games silver medalists for Chinese Taipei
Asian Games bronze medalists for Chinese Taipei
World Games gold medalists
Medalists at the 1998 Asian Games
Medalists at the 2002 Asian Games
Medalists at the 2006 Asian Games
World Games silver medalists
Competitors at the 2001 World Games
Competitors at the 2009 World Games
21st-century Taiwanese people